WJPD (92.3 FM) is a radio station licensed to Ishpeming, Michigan broadcasting a country music format. It serves the Marquette area. It can be heard as far east as Newberry, as far north as Thunder Bay, as far west as Bergland, and as far south as Ludington.

Programming
The station, named for its founding owner, James P. Deegan, originated live programming in 1975, in simulcast with WJPD AM 1240 (founded in 1947). Its original programming consisted of live, on-air music personalities, news personnel focused on local news in conjunction with carrying NBC Network news in the hour.

In addition, local public service announcements were read live by popular local on-air personalities. WJPD sportscasters provided live play by play coverage and sports shows of local High School athletics - broadcasting one game on AM and another game in FM. In addition, the extremely popular "Telephone Time" (a local live listener call-in show) was aired from 9-10 a.m. M-S. in which callers could advertise personal items for sale or looking to purchase.

WJPD AM-FM would not be simulcast on Sunday mornings, as both AM and FM stations carried a number of local church services and specialized music programming.

WJPD was also a Milwaukee Brewers and Green Bay Packers network station, along with NMU Wildcat game broadcasts.

Country & Western from 12:30 - 6:00 pm. Mainstream Pop & Rock (along with recurrents and oldies) 6:00 - Midnight (sign-off)

The music format became all C&W in 1981 (with live, local DJs) and a continued emphasis on local news, weather, sports, and public address programming.

WJPD AM & FM consistently received the top Arbitron ratings for the listening coverage area during this time period.

This live, locally oriented, programming continued through the early 1990's, until private ownership sold WJPD AM & FM to a nationwide media conglomerate. Several subsequent sales to other media conglomerates eliminated the locally oriented home-town station identity - and the 1240 AM station's FCC license - in favor of predominently network satellite radio programming in 92.3 FM.

The current BIG Country 92.3 WJPD carries Premiere Radio Network's syndicated 'Big D & Bubba', every weekday morning from 6am to 10am. Following Big D & Bubba is Mid-Days with Steve Cassidy, airing Monday-Saturday from 10am to 3pm. 'The Drive Home' is hosted by Iain Black, and airs Monday-Friday from 3pm to 7pm. Winding down the day is Dial Global's syndicated Lia Knight program, which airs Monday-Friday from 7pm to midnight. BIG Country 92.3 WJPD has long been the dominant station in Marquette County, maintaining a 33 share in the latest County-by-County ratings.

BIG Country 92.3 WJPD's Program Director and News/Sports Director is Eric Tasson (Ryan Erickson), Brodie Woodward (Iain Black) is the station's Production Director/Film Critic, and Joey D is the station's Music Director.

Other Programming on BIG Country 92.3 WJPD includes:

Thunder Road with Steve Mitchell - Saturday Morning's at 7am.

Retro Country USA with Ken Cooper - Sunday Morning's at 9am.

The Crook & Chase Countdown - Sunday Morning's at 11am.

History of call letters
The call letters WJPD were previously assigned to an AM station in Ishpeming. It began broadcasting November 16, 1947, on 1240 kHz with 1,000 Watts daytime - 250 Watts power nightime.
The call letters refer to the founder and original owner, James P. Deegan.

References

Sources 
Michiguide.com - WJPD History

External links

JPD-FM
Marquette County, Michigan
Radio stations established in 1975